State Road 507 (SR 507) is a , four-lane highway serving Melbourne and Palm Bay, Florida. It is also known locally as Babcock Street. The southern terminus is an intersection with Malabar Road (SR 514 east of SR 507, County Road 514 west of it) in Palm Bay; the current northern terminus is an intersection with New Haven Avenue (U.S. Highway 192 (US 192)/SR 500) in Melbourne.

Route description
Babcock Street is a major commuter road for Palm Bay, one of the fastest-growing cities in the United States since 1980.  The northern half (in Melbourne) features shopping centers and the main campus of Florida Institute of Technology; the southern half (in Palm Bay) passes through a large housing development.

County Road 507
South of SR 514, Babcock Road becomes a signed County Road 507 (CR 507), which continues  southward to the boundary between Brevard County and Indian River County, four miles (6 km) north of Fellsmere.  The road continues as County Road 507 to the intersection of County Road 512. Major destinations the road passes through are Port Malabar Industrial Park, Fountainhead Memorial Park, Greenwood Plantation, Deer Run, Sebastian Canal, and Downtown Fellsmere.

County Road 507 north of US 192 is a primary commercial boulevard for Melbourne, with businesses lining both sides of the street.

History
The historic northern terminus is  further north, an intersection with Harbor City Boulevard (U.S. Route 1/SR 5), also in Melbourne (the former northern section of SR 507 is now unsigned County Road 507).

Major intersections

References

External links

507
507
507
507
State Roads in Palm Bay, Florida
State Roads in Melbourne, Florida